The FA Trophy, currently known as the IZIBET FA Trophy for sponsorship reasons, is an annual football cup competition that takes place in Malta. The cup was founded in 1933; following a match between England and Italy, played in Rome in May 1933, to where a number of pro-British Maltese supporters travelled to support the English side. The Football Association as recognition donated a silver trophy to be played on the model of the FA Cup.

The team who wins the cup, wins a place in the First qualifying round of the UEFA Europa Conference League. This competition is now played on a knock-out basis between all the senior clubs in the Maltese and Gozitan football pyramids. The cup winners play a match for the Maltese Super Cup against the league champions of the season.

Format

The ten teams from the First Division and the teams which placed from 4th to the 10th position in the previous season's league, participate in the first round. The cup holders and the top 3 teams are seeded. The eight winning teams play again in the second round, after which, four teams remain. The top three teams in the previous' year league and the cup holders enter straight in the quarter-final phase, together with the other four winning teams.

Starting with the 2009–10 competition, the reigning champions of the Gozo First Division will also be entered into the competition. This will be the case unless Gozo FC, a club based on Gozo but which plays in the Maltese leagues, are playing in either the Maltese Premier League or Maltese First Division and would take the place of the Gozo champion.

On 13 January 2011, the Malta Football Association decided to restructure the format of the trophy as from season 2011–12. Following the success of the MFA League Anniversary Cup, where the then 21 teams of the Maltese four-tiered system participated in the competition, the MFA decided to include all the clubs of Maltese leagues, together with the clubs from the Gozo First Division and the Gozo Second Division. The Gozitan clubs and those from the Maltese Third Division would take part in the First Round, joined by the Maltese Second Division and Maltese First Division clubs in the Second Round, and joined by the Maltese Premier League clubs in a Third Round, where the first six teams of the previous season and the Trophy holder would be seeded. The competition remains on a knock-out basis.

On 21 May 2016, the old silver trophy has been replaced by a new one, partially paid by the english FA. The new trophy has been presented right before the match between England and Malta for the 2018 World Cup qualifiers. The new Trophy will be 65 cm in height, and 7 kilogrammes in weight, six of which are solid silver. The trophy will be produced with the traditional methods of silversmithing, by hand. The new Trophy will carry forward the main features of the current FA Trophy, with the player holding the ball aloft being the top part on a silver pedestal, also featured on the current trophy, containing the exact wording which symbolises the bond between the English FA and the Malta FA, the globe and the base will remain identical, with the effigy of the football match found on the current trophy also retaining its place. The new trophy has been designed in the shape of the old Cassar Cup, which was another historical competition of the MFA in which the best two British service teams used to play against the two best Maltese teams for the cup. Veterans recall the passion of these matches with the Maltese football aficionados all rooting for the Maltese teams against the British ones.

Since this new restructuring of the competition in the 2011–12 season, already a major resemblance to the English F.A. Cup is evident as a lot of giant-killings have already taken place. The best story so far has been that of S.K. Victoria Wanderers F.C. reaching the semi-finals of the 2016-17 edition,  as they became the first Gozitan club has reached in this competition.

Both the 2019–20 and the 2020–21 seasons of the trophy has been declared abandoned by the MFA due to the spread of the COVID-19 pandemic.

Winners and finalists

Performance by club

References

External links
 The FA Trophy
 Trophy on MaltaFootball.com

 
1
National association football cups
1933 establishments in Malta